The 2017–18 Tour de Ski was the 12th edition of the Tour de Ski, part of the 2017–18 FIS Cross-Country World Cup. The World Cup stage event began in Lenzerheide, Switzerland, on December 30, 2017, and ended in Val di Fiemme, Italy, on January 7, 2018. The cups were defended by Heidi Weng (Norway) and Sergey Ustiugov (Russia).

Schedule

a.  Stage 4 was cancelled due to the bad weather.
b.  Stage 5 men's distance was shortened due to previous day's storm damage.

Overall leadership

Final standings

Overall standings

Sprint standings

Team standings

Stages

Stage 1
30 December 2017, Lenzerheide, Switzerland
 Bonus seconds to the 30 skiers that qualifies for the quarter-finals, distributed as following:
 Final: 60–54–48–46–44–42
 Semi-final: 32–30–28–26–24–22
 Quarter-final: 10–10–10–8–8–8–8–8–6–6–6–6–6–4–4–4–4–4

Stage 2
31 December 2017, Lenzerheide, Switzerland
 Bonus seconds in finish: 15–10–5 to the 3 fastest skiers.

Stage 3
1 January 2018, Lenzerheide, Switzerland
 Bonus seconds in finish: 15–10–5 to the 3 first skiers crossing the finish line.

Stage 4
3 January 2018, Oberstdorf, Germany
 Stage was cancelled due to the bad weather.

Stage 5
4 January 2018, Oberstdorf, Germany

Stage 5 bonus seconds
 Men: 2 intermediate sprints, bonus seconds to the 10 first skiers (15–12–10–8–6–5–4–3–2–1) past the intermediate points.
 Women: 1 intermediate sprint, bonus seconds to the 10 first skiers (15–12–10–8–6–5–4–3–2–1) past the intermediate point.
 Bonus seconds in finish: 15–10–5 to the 3 first skiers crossing the finish line.

Stage 6
6 January 2018, Val di Fiemme, Italy

Stage 6 bonus seconds
 Men: 2 intermediate sprints, bonus seconds to the 10 first skiers (15–12–10–8–6–5–4–3–2–1) past the intermediate points.
 Women: 1 intermediate sprint, bonus seconds to the 10 first skiers (15–12–10–8–6–5–4–3–2–1) past the intermediate point.
 Bonus seconds in finish: 15–10–5 to the 3 first skiers crossing the finish line.

Stage 7
7 January 2018, Val di Fiemme, Italy

The race for "Fastest of the Day" counts for 2017–18 FIS Cross-Country World Cup points. No bonus seconds were awarded on this stage.

References

Tour de Ski
2017 18
2017 in Swiss sport
2017 in cross-country skiing
2018 in German sport
2018 in Swiss sport
2018 in Italian sport
2018 in cross-country skiing
December 2017 sports events in Europe
January 2018 sports events in Europe